Debora Sacha Menicucci Anzola (born May 2, 1991 in Caracas) is a Venezuelan actress, model, fashion designer and beauty pageant titleholder who won the Miss Venezuela World 2014 title. She represented Venezuela in Miss World 2014, in London (England), on December 14, 2014.

Menicucci was crowned Miss Venezuela World 2014 during the second edition of Miss Venezuela World pageant, held on August 2, 2014 in Caracas. She was crowned by the outgoing titleholder Karen Soto.

Debora previously competed in Miss Venezuela 2013, when she represented Amazonas state. She won the Best Catwalk and Miss Attitude awards.

Personal life 
She is married to the Venezuelan Supreme Court President, Maikel Moreno.

References

External links
Miss Venezuela Official Website
Miss World Official Website
Miss Venezuela La Nueva Era MB

1991 births
Living people
Venezuelan female models
Venezuelan people of Italian descent
Miss World 2014 delegates
People from Caracas